Arylsulfatase C may refer to one of two enzymes:
Steroid sulfatase
Steryl-sulfatase